Auður (Modern Icelandic spelling) or Auðr (Old Icelandic spelling) is an Old Norse-Icelandic female personal name. It also has the variant forms Unnr (Old Icelandic) and Unnur (Modern Icelandic). It is sometimes rendered as Aud, Audr, or Unn in English and in other languages.

People and characters from medieval sources
 Auðr (mythology), the son of Nótt and Naglfari in Snorra Edda
 Auðr in djúpauðga Ívarsdóttir, settler of Iceland
 Auðr in djúpauðga Ketilsdóttir (834-900 AD), the wife of Olaf the White of Dublin, "King" of Ireland

Post-medieval Icelandic women
 Auður Auðuns (1911–1999), lawyer and politician
 Auður Laxness (1918–2012), writer and craftsperson
 Auður Ava Ólafsdóttir (born 1958), writer and professor of art history
 Auður Jónsdóttir (born 1973), writer

Organisations
 Auður Capital, financial service company
 Nidingr (band), a band formerly known as Audr

See also
 Unnur, a given name

Icelandic feminine given names